Chicago Justice is an American legal drama television series that aired on NBC from March 1 to May 14, 2017. The series was created by Dick Wolf and is the fourth installment of Wolf's Chicago franchise. A backdoor pilot aired on May 11, 2016, as part of the third season of Chicago P.D. before being ordered to series. The show follows the prosecutors and investigators at the Cook County State's Attorney's Office as they navigate their way through Chicago area politics, the legal arena, and media coverage while pursuing justice.

On May 22, 2017, NBC canceled the series after one season, making it the first series in the Chicago franchise to end. After the show ended, Philip Winchester's character Peter Stone became a regular on Law & Order: Special Victims Unit where Chernuchin became showrunner, while Jon Seda's character Antonio Dawson returned to Chicago P.D. The show averaged a 1.5 rating (adults 18-49, Live+7) in comparison to 1.9 for Chicago P.D. and Chicago Med, with Chicago Fire receiving a 2.3 rating that season. Despite the show performing marginally better than Shades of Blue and Taken, NBC executives stated it was canceled due to sustainability and real estate for other programs.

Premise
Set in Chicago, Chicago Justice follows the State's Attorney team of prosecutors and investigators who work to bring justice to victims.

Cast and characters

Main
 Philip Winchester as Assistant State's Attorney Peter Stone, the Deputy Bureau Chief of the State's Attorney's Office Special Prosecutions Bureau. His father is Benjamin Stone, an assistant district attorney in New York City. Stone would later become the ADA of the sex crimes bureau in New York. He previously played professional baseball in the Chicago Cubs organization but his career ended when he tore his UCL.
 Jon Seda as Chief Investigator Antonio Dawson. Before joining the State's Attorney's office, he worked as a detective in the 21st District with the Chicago P.D.
 Joelle Carter as Investigator Laura Nagel.  Also a former Chicago police officer like Dawson, Nagel left the force and developed an addiction to painkillers after a line-of-duty injury.  She has been clean for months and is now struggling to regain custody of her daughter.
 Monica Barbaro as Assistant State's Attorney Anna Valdez, Stone's second chair.
 Carl Weathers as Cook County State's Attorney Mark Jefferies.  He served as a Marine during the Vietnam War.

Recurring
 Lindsey Pearlman as Joy Fletcher
 Matthew C. Yee as Ronnie Chen
 Tyrone Phillips as Tyrone Jones
 Tim Kazurinsky as Judge Emerson
 Gary Basaraba as William O'Boyle
 James Vincent Meredith as Judge
 Rammel Chan as Virgil Li
 John Lu as Clerk

Episodes

Backdoor pilot (2016)

Season 1 (2017)

Production

Development
The show was confirmed on January 21 during the 2016 Television Critics Association winter press tour, with the working title Chicago Law. By March 11, the title was changed to Chicago Justice.  Filming began on March 28 for the backdoor pilot that aired on May 11 as the 21st episode of the third season of Chicago P.D. The pilot is partially based on historical events and is based on a true story. On May 12, 2016, a day after the backdoor pilot aired on Chicago P.D., NBC gave the show a series order. The series premiered on March 1, 2017, concluding a crossover with Chicago Fire and Chicago P.D. It then ran in its scheduled time slot beginning March 5, 2017.

Casting
Philip Winchester was the first to be cast on February 19, 2016, as Peter Stone, the prosecutor who put Voight in prison years ago. His father is Benjamin Stone, an assistant district attorney on the first four seasons of Law & Order. Nazneen Contractor joined the series on March 11, 2016, and Joelle Carter on March 14, 2016. Rocky alum Carl Weathers joined the cast on March 19 as Cook County State's Attorney Mark Jefferies, while Ryan-James Hatanaka was added to the cast on March 24. Lorraine Toussaint reprised her role in the pilot as defense attorney Shambala Green, who appeared in seven episodes of Law & Order. Contractor exited the show on July 7, 2016, to join the cast of the CBS police procedural drama Ransom. On August 25, 2016, Monica Barbaro was added to the cast. On September 28, it was reported that Jon Seda's character Antonio Dawson would move from P.D. to Justice, where Antonio would become an investigator for the State's Attorney's office. With this move, Hatanaka departed the series. Richard Brooks reprised his Law & Order role of Paul Robinette in the episode "Uncertainty Principle". Tovah Feldshuh appeared on the premiere episode as her Law & Order character Danielle Melnick who has become a judge.

Reception

Critical response
The review aggregation website Rotten Tomatoes reported a 70% approval rating, with an average rating of 5.21 out of 10 based on 10 reviews. The website's critical consensus reads: "Chicago Justice's first season won't sway procedural nonbelievers, but for fans of the franchise, it marks another solid entry that should satisfy faithful viewers and newcomers alike." On Metacritic, which uses a weighted average, the show scored 57 out of 100, based on 9 critics, indicating generally "mixed or average reviews".

Ratings

Home media

References

External links
 
  on Wolf Entertainment
 

2010s American drama television series
2010s American legal television series
2017 American television series debuts
2017 American television series endings
American legal drama television series
American television spin-offs
Television shows set in Chicago
Chicago (franchise)
English-language television shows
NBC original programming
Television series by Universal Television
Television series by Wolf Films
Television series about prosecutors